The government of Kazakhstan created the National Fund of the Republic of Kazakhstan in 2000 in order to manage oil revenue more effectively. Tax revenues from certain oil and gas companies accumulate this fund. The list of oil and gas companies updated by the government of Kazakhstan. 
Information about revenues and expenditures of the fund is provided by the central bank of Kazakhstan and by the Ministry of Finance of Kazakhstan.

References

Government-owned companies of Kazakhstan
Petroleum in Kazakhstan
Financial services companies established in 2000
2000 establishments in Kazakhstan
Finance in Kazakhstan